This is a list of buildings that are examples of Art Deco in Europe:

Albania 
 Hotel Green, Tirana
 Majestik Cinema Theatre, Korca, 1927
 Palace of Culture, Korçë
 Royal Villa of Durrës (Zog's Palace), Durrës, 1937
 Supreme Court of Albania, Tirana
Swedish Embassy, Tirana

Armenia 
 Armenia Marriott Hotel, Yerevan, 1958
 Cafesjian Museum of Art, Yerevan, 1980–2009

Austria 
 3 Blindengasse, Vienna, 1927
 , Vienna, 1929
 , Vienna, 1921
  Theatre, Vienna, 1905
 Cinemagic Kino, Vienna, 1950
 Döbling Carmelite Nunnery Altar of Christ the King, Unterdöbling, Vienna, 1922
 Filmcasino, Vienna, 1911, 1954
 Karl-Marx-Hof, Vienna, 1930
 Sanatorium Purkersdorf, Punkersdorf, Vienna, 1903, 1927
 Trafostation Währinger Gürtel (transformer station),

Belarus 
 National Academic Grand Opera and Ballet Theatre of the Republic of Belarus, Minsk, 1938

Belgium 
  (Mena brewery), Rotselaar, 1933
 , Braine-l'Alleud, 1904
 , Zwevegem
  home at 91 Strijdhoflaan, Berchem, 1925
  (Holy Family Church), Duinbergen, 1939
  (City Hall), Charleroi, 1936
 Klooster Sint-Norbertushuis (Monastery), 1924
 , Sint-Niklaas, 1929
 , Quaregnon, 1938
 , Dour, 1931
 Maison Remy, Charleroi
 , Thulin, 1926
 Maison des Trois Grâces, Charleroi
  (Church of Our Lady), Sint-Amandsberg, 1933
 , Blankenberge, 1929
 Pompage Station, Saint-Nicholas
 , Mons, Hainaut/Hénau
 , Zottegem, 1938
 , Zottegem, 1929
 
 , Sint-Niklaas, 1925
 , Sint-Niklaas

Antwerp 
 57–59 Hilda Ramstraat, Berchem, Antwerp, 1923
 Belgische Fruitbeurs (Belgian fruit market), Antwerp, 1936
 Boerentoren (now the KBC Tower), Antwerp, 1931
  (Church of Christ the King), Antwerp, 1930
  (Caserne de sapeurs-pompiers), Halenstraat, Antwerp, 1947
 , Antwerp, 1921
 , Doerne, Antwerp, 1923
 Maison Tilquin, Antwerp, 1933
  (Parish Church of Our Lady of Continuous Assistance), Deurne, Antwerp, 1925
 , Antwerp, 1931
 Provinciaal Technisch Instituut, Deurne, Antwerp, 1923
 , Klein-Antwerpen, Antwerp, 1932
 Residentie Van Rijswijck apartments, Antwerp, 1932
 De Roma Theatre, Antwerp, 1928
 Voetgangerstunnel (pedestrian tunnel), Antwerp, 1933
 Sint-Laurentiuskerk, Antwerp, 1934
 , Antwerp, 1932
 , Antwerp, 1926

Brussels 

 , Ixelles, Brussels, 1929
 , Brussels
 Aux Armes des Brasseurs café by Adrien Blomme, Brussels, 1939
 , Brussels, 1933
 , Brussels, 1929
 Brussels Central Station, Brussels, 1952
 Centre Culturel Jacques Franck, Brussels, 1930s
 Centre for Fine Arts by Victor Horta, Brussels, 1928
 , Schaerbeek, Brussels, 1932
 Church of St. Augustine, Forest, Brussels, 1935
 Church of St. John the Baptist, Molenbeek, Brussels, 1931
 , Schaerbeek, Brussels, 1928
 , Anderlecht, Brussels, 1937
 Clockarium, Schaerbeek, Brussels, 1935
 , Brussels, 1932
  (now the House of European History), Brussels, 1935
  building, Brussels, 1931
 Le Flagey (formerly the Maison de la Radio), Brussels, 1938
 Forest's Town Hall, Brussels, 1938
 Galeries Cinema, Brussels, 1939
 , Brussels, 1928
 , Brussels, 1921
 , Brussels, 1928
 , Brussels, 1928
 , Brussels, 1931
 Hôtel Le Plaza, Brussels, 1930
 , Brussels, 1929
 , Brussels, 1925
 , Brussels, 1923–1926
 La Magnéto belge bed and breakfast, Brussels, 1942
 , Ixelles, Brussels
 , Brussels, 1926
 , Brussels, 1932
 , Forest, Brussels, 1934
 Museum David and Alice van Buuren, Uccle, Brussels, 1925
 National Basilica of the Sacred Heart, Brussels, 1970
 , Brussels, 1928
 , Dieleghem, 1921
 Résidence de la Cambre, Brussels, 1939
 Residence Palace (now part of the Europa building), European Quarter, Brussels, 1927
  (Rotterdamsche Verzekering Societeiten), Brussels, 1936
 Shell building, Rue Ravenstein, Brussels, 1934
 Stoclet Palace, Brussels, 1911
 Theatre Marni, Ixelles, Brussels, 1948
  cinema, Brussels, 1933
 Vendome Cinema (formerly Le Roy Cinema) Upper Town, Brussels, 1939
 Villa Empain, Brussels, 1934
 , Brussels, 1930
 , Brussels

Ghent 
  (Excelsior brewery), Ghent, 1929
 , Ghent, 1930
 Boekentoren (University Library Tower), Ghent University, Ghent, 1935

Liège 
 , Liège, 1993
 Cine Midi-Minuit, Liège
 , Liège, 1922
  (Tower of the Interallied Memorial), Liège, 1935
 , Liège, 1839, 1937
 , Quai de Rome, Liège
  former store, Liège
 , Liège, 1926

Bosnia and Herzegovina 
 Central Bank of Bosnia and Herzegovina (formerly Mortgage Bank and Narodna Banka), Sarajevo, 1929
 Džidžikovac apartment complex, Sarajevo, 1948
 Pension Fund Building, Sarajevo, 1940
 Red Cross Building, Sarajevo, 1928

Bulgaria 
 The Beach apartments, Varna, 1933
 Bulgarian National Film Archive, Sofia, 1935

Croatia 
 Hotel, Dubrovnik (formerly Hotel Milinov), Zagreb, 1929
 Kastner and Öhler department store (NAMA), Zagreb, 1928

Cyprus 
 Achiilleion Building, Old Town, Nicosia
 Bank of Cyprus, Limassol, 1947
 former Bank of Cyprus, Morphou
 former Evkaf Hotel, Old Town, Nicosia, 1958-1962
 Lantis Brothers Coca-Cola Plant, Nicosia-Engomi, 1952
 Municipal Market, Nicosia, 1930s
 Municipal Market, Idskele
 Nicolaou Press building, Old Town, Nicosia, 1938
 Nicosia Palace Hotel, Old Town, Nicosia, 1930s
 Pallas Cinema, Old Town, Nicosia
 Post Office, Land Department, and Courts, Morphou (Guzelyurt)
 Public Hospital, Limassol
 Rex Cinema, Limassol
 Rialto Cinematic Theatre, Limassol, 1930s
 Severeios Library, Old Town, Nicosia, 1949
 Sokrates Hotel, City Center, Kyrenia (Girne)
 Telecommunications Building, Nicosia
 Town Hall, Limassol
 former wine factory, Old Port, Limassol

Czech Republic 
 , Brno
 Art Deco House, Zámecká, Mělník
 Pardubice Crematorium, Pardubice, 1923
 Fara House, Pelhrimov, 1913
 Hotel Alcron, Prague, 1926
 , Karlovy Vary, 1912
 Hotel Imperial Cafe, Prague
 , Žižkov, Prague
 , České Budějovice, 1924
  (Cinema at the Ořechovka Central Building), Prague, 1923
  (Cinema), 1921
 Moučkova Villa, Liběchov
  (Palace), Prague
  (Melantrich Building - Marks and Spencer), Wenceslas Square, Prague, 1913
  (Palace), Prague, 1912
 , Prague, 1921
 Former Savoy Café, Zátka waterfront, České Budějovice
 Šupich Houses (Palác Rokoko), Prague, 1916
 Vila Viktora Kříže, Pardubice, 1925
 Villa of Josef Kovářík, Prostějov, 1921
 , Prague

Denmark 
 Bellevue Theatre, Copenhagen, 1936
  (Dagmar Theatre), Copenhagen, 1883, 1937
 Danske Spritvebrikker (Distillers), Aalborg, 1931
 Hotel Astoria, Copenhagen, 1935
 Metropol (formerly Palads Teatret), Aarhus, 1951
 Novo Nordisk/Novozymes Factory, Copenhagen, 1935
 , Copenhagen, 1936
 The Standard Building (former Customs Office), Copenhagen, 1937
 Stærekassen (New Theatre), Copenhagen, 1931
  (former Pharmacy), Copenhagen, 1934

Estonia 
 Eestimaa Kinnituse AS building on Vabaduse väljak (Freedom Square), Tallinn, 1932
 Inges Kindlustus insurance office, Tallinn
 Kolm Lille florist, Tallinn
 Rannahotell Beach Hotel, Pärnu, 1937

Finland 

 Apartments at Jääkärinkatu 13, Helsinki,1931
Apartments at Kasarminkatu 8, Helsinki, 1935
FC Perintä Oy offices, Helsinki, 1927
Fida Roba store, Helskini, 1938
Finnkino Tennispalatsi Theatre (former tennis courts), Helsinki, 1938, 1999
Galleria Sinne, Helsinki, 1938
 Helsinki Central Station, Helsinki, 1919
 Helsinki Olympic Stadium, Helsinki, 1938
Hotel Lilla Roberts, Helsinki, 1929
 Hotell Torni, Helsinki, 1931
Lasipalatsi Film and Media Centre (formerly Bio Rex), Helsinki
New Student Union Building, Helsinki, 
 Orion Theatre, Helsinki, 1920
 Pori Railway Station, Pori, 1938
 Savoy Theatre, Helsinki, 1937
 Tennispalatsi, Kamppi, Helsinki, 1938
 Yrjönkatu Swimming Hall, Kamppi, Helsinki, 1928

France 

 Atrium Casino, Dax, 1928
 Beffroi de l'Hôtel de Ville de Lille (Belfry of the City Hall), 1932
 , Biarritz, Pyrénées-Atlantiques, 1929
 Cinéma Eden, Saint-Jean-d'Angély, 1931
 Douaumont Ossuary, Douaumont, 1932
 Ecole élémentaire Aristide Briand (elementary school), Lyon, 1932
 École supérieure des arts et techniques de la mode (ESMOD), Lyon
 , Maisons-Alfort, Val-de-Marne, 1933
 , Roupy, Aisne, Hauts-de-France, 1922
 Gare Maritime de Cherbourg, Cherbourg, 1933
 Gare de Rouen Rue Verte, Rouen, Normandy, 1928
 , Longlaville, Lorraine, 1928
 , Béthune, 1927
 Halle Tony Garnier, Lyon, 1988
 Helene Boucher High School, Paris, 1935
 Hotel Belvédère du Rayon Vert, Cerbère, 1932
 Hôtel Martinez, Cannes, 1929
  (CGA Building), Nantes, 1935
 L'Armendèche Lighthouse, Les Sables-d'Olonne. 1968
 , Nancy, 1933
 , Nice, 1933
 Palais de la Méditerranée, Nice, 1929
 Paris–Le Bourget Airport, Le Bourget, 1919
 Parking Garage, Plomb
 , Lyon, 1933
 La Piscine Museum, Roubaix, 1932
 Sainte Jeanne d'Arc Church, Nice, completed 1934
 Sainte-Thérèse-de-l'Enfant-Jésus Church, Hirson, Aisne, 1929
 Stade Chaban-Delmas, Bordeaux, Gironde, 1930
 Théâtre de l'Eperon, Angoulême, 1962
 Thiepval Memorial, Thiepval, Picardy, 1932
 Cherbourg Maritime station (Rail station and harbor), Cherbourg, 1933

Beausoleil, Provence-Alpes-Côte d'Azur 
 Jardins d'Elisa, Beausoleil, Provence-Alpes-Côte d'Azur
 Maison Bleue/Blue Villa, Barcelonnette, Provence-Alpes-Côte d'Azur, 1931
 Mirador, Beausoleil, Provence-Alpes-Côte d'Azur
 Palais Mary, Beausoleil
 Palais Stella, Beausoleil
 Post Office, Beausoleil
 Sea View Residence, Beausoleil

Bordeaux 
source:

  (Labor exchange board), Victoire, Bordeaux, 1938.
 Café du Levant, Bordeaux, 1923.
 Chaban-Delmas Stadium, Bordeaux, 1938.
 Lescure district, Bordeaux.
 , Bordeaux, 1929.
 , Bordeaux, 1878, 1927.
 , La Bastide, Bordeaux, 1925.
 , Bordeaux, 1930.
  (Judaic pool), Bordeaux, 1925.
  (Municipal pool), Bègles (Bordeaux suburb), 1925.
 , La Bastide, Bordeaux.
 Maison Saint-Louis Beaulieu, diocesan house, 1937–40.
 Théâtre la Pergola, Caudéran, Bordeaux, 1927.
 Interior of the Maison du vin, house of the winemaker and winetrader union.
 Gare Saint-Louis, former station, now commercial center.
 Bains-douches du Bouscat, public baths, Le Bouscat (Bordeaux suburb).

Limoges 
 , Limoges, 1925–1932
 , Limoges, 1924
 Gare de Limoges-Bénédictins, Limoges, 1929
 , Limoges, 1919

Paris 
 , 6th Arrondissement, Paris, 1930
 , 8th Arrondissement, Paris, 1935
 , 10th Arrondissement, Paris, 1956
 , 17th Arrondissement, Paris, 1938
 , 10th, Paris, 1858, 1932
 Folies Bergère, 9th Arrondissement, Paris, 1868, 1926
 , 9th Arrondissement, Paris, 1927
 Grand Rex, 2nd Arrondissement, Paris, 1932
 Hôtel Lutetia, 6th Arrondissement, Paris, 1910
 , 10th, Paris, 1921
 Lycée Hélène Boucher, 20th Arrondissement, Paris, 1935
 Maison de la Mutualité, 5th Arrondissement, Paris
 , 11th, Paris, 1934
 Max Linder Panorama cinema, 9th, Paris, 1914, 1932
 , 9th, Paris, 1893, 1954
 Palais de Chaillot, 16th Arrondissement, Paris, 1937
 Palais de la Porte Dorée, 12th Arrondissement, Paris, 1931
 Palais de Tokyo, 16th Arrondissement, Paris, 1937
 Pelleport (Paris Métro), 20th Arrondissement, Paris, 1921
 Piscine Molitor, 16th Arrondissement, Paris, 1929
 Place des Fêtes (Paris Métro), 19th Arrondissement, Paris, 1911
 Porte des Lilas (Paris Métro), 19th Arrondissement, Paris, 1921
 Saint-Esprit Church, 12th Arrondissement, Paris, 1928–1935
 Saint-Fargeau (Paris Métro), 20th Arrondissement, Paris, 1921
 Saint Jean-Baptiste Church, Bagnoles de l'Orne, France (Olivier Michelin,  1934–1935)
 , 14th, Paris, 1934
 La Samaritaine, 1st Arrondissement, Paris, 1869, 1928
 Théâtre de la Michodière, 2nd Arrondissement, Paris, 1925
 Théâtre des Champs-Élysées, 8h Arrondissement, Paris, 1913,
 Trocadéro, 16th Arrondissement, Paris, 1937
 UGC Grand Normandie Cinema, Paris, 1937, 1969
 Vaneau (Paris Métro), 7th Arrondissement, Paris, 1923
 Villa La Roche/Maison La Roche, 16th Arrondissement, Paris, 1925
 , 11th, Paris, 1939

Reims 
 Carnegie Library of Reims, Reims, 1927
 , Reims
 Foujita Chapel, Reims, 1964
 , Reims, 1923
 , Reims, 1922
 , Reims, 1924
 , Reims, 1925
 former , Reims, 1934
  (Central market), Reims, 1929
 , Reims, 1926
  (Post office), Reims, 1930
 Reims Opera House interior, Reims, 1873, 1930
  (Tennis Club pool), Reims, 1923
 , Reims, 1934

Saint-Quentin 
 former Le Carillon theatre, San Quentin, Aisne, Hauts-de-France
 Chapelle Sainte-Thérèse-de-l'Enfant-Jésus de Neuville, Ville de Saint-Quentin, Aisne, Hauts-de-France, 1933
 Conservatoire de Musique et de Théâtre, Saint-Quentin, Aisne, Hauts-de-France
 , Saint-Quentin, Aisne, Hauts-de-France
 , Vichy, Auvergne-Rhône-Alpes, 1672, 1931
 Gare de Saint-Quentin railway station, Saint-Quentin, Aisne, Hauts-de-France, 1926
 , Saint-Quentin, Aisne, Hauts-de-France, 1925
 La Poste, rue de Lyon (Post office), Saint-Quentin, Aisne, Hauts-de-France, 1929

Georgia 
 , Tbilisi, 1938
 Marjanishvili Theatre, Tbilisi, 1928

Germany 

 , Cologne, 1924/1927
 Chilehaus, Hamburg, 1924
 Die Glocke, Bremen, 1928
 Disch-Haus, Cologne, 1930
 Hansahochhaus, Cologne, 1925
  (Holy Cross Church),  Ückendorf, Gelsenkirchen, North Rhine-Westphalia, 1927
 Schocken Department Store, Stuttgart, 1926
  (Naumann settlement), Cologne, 1927–1929
 , Castrop-Rauxel-Ickern, North Rhine-Westphalia, 1925
  (Saint Engelbert Church), Cologne, 1932

Berlin 
 Astor Film Lounge (formerly Kino im Kindl, KiKi, Pavillon, Film Palast), Berlin, 1948
 Babylon apartments and Babylon Kino, Berlin, 1929
 Berliner Kabarett-Theater, Berlin, 1930, 1934, 1937
 Columbia Theatre, Berlin, 1951
 Kirche am Hohenzollernplatz (Church), Berlin, 1934
 , Berlin, 1929
 Maison de France, Cinema Paris, Berlin, 1950
 Metropol Berlin Nollendorfplatz, Berlin, 1906, 1930
 Mossehaus, Berlin, 1923
 Olympiastadion, Berlin, 1936
 Poststadion, Berlin, 1929
 , Berlin
 Schaubuhne am Lehniner Platz (formerly Universum Kino, Luxor Palast, Halensee Palast, Capitol Kino), Berlin, 1928
 Zoo Palast (formerly Bikini, UCI Kinowelt Zoo Palast), Berlin, 1957

Greece 
source:
 , Athens, 1930
 , Athens, 1928
 Aquarium of Rhodes, Rhodes, 1937
 Athens University of Economics and Business, Athens, 1926
 Bank of Greece Building, Althens, 1933–1938
 Cinema, Lakki, Leros, 1938
 City Link/Attica commercial centre, Athens
 Egnatia Palace Hotel, Thessaloniki
 Ethniko Kotopouli-Rex, Athens, 1937
 General Accounting Office of Greece, Athens, 1928
 , Athens, 1935
 The Modernist Hotel, Thessaloniki, 1920s
 New Agora (New Market), Mandraki, Rhodes, 1923
 Pallas Cinema & Theatre Hall, Athens, 1927, 1940
 Papaleonardou Apartments, Athens, 1925
 Rex Theatre (Athens)|Rex Theatre, Athens
 , Kos, 1934

Hungary 
 , Budapest, 1930
 46 Dohány Street, Budapest, 1929
 , Budapest, 1935
  (Mausoleum of Heroes), Debrecen, 1932
 , Balassagyarmat, 1913
 , Budapest, 1938
  (Markó Street Electric Works building), Budapest, 1932
 Népszínház Street 37, Budapest, 1912
 Post Office, Kossuth Street, Cegléd, 1929
  (Sportshall of Margaret Island), Budapest, 1931

Iceland 
 Akureyrarkirkja, Akureyri, 1940
 Hallgrímskirkja, Reykjavik, 1945
 Hotel Borg, Reykjavik
 National Theatre of Iceland (Þjóðleikhúsið), Reykjavik, 1950
 Sundhöllin, Reykjavík, 1937

Ireland 
source:
 The Art Deco Theatre Ballymote, Rathnakelliga, Sligo
 Bank of Ireland Building, Belfast
 Bull Wall public bath shelters, Dublin
 Camden De Luxe (now the Palace club), Dublin
 Chancery House, Dublin, 1930–1940
 Church of Christ the King, Turner's Cross, Cork (city)
 Countess Markiewvicz House, Dublin, 1939
 Dara Cinema (formerly Coliseum Cinema), Naas, 1940
 Department of Enterprise, Trade and Employment, Dublin, 1939
 Dublin Airport, Dublin, 1939, 1950
 Dublin Institute of Technology, School of Culinary Arts and Food Technology, Cathal Brugha Street, Dublin, 1939
 Forum Theatre (formerly the Regal), Waterford, 1937
 Gas Building (now the School of Nursing and Midwifery Studies, Trinity College), Dublin, 1818, 1934
 Inchicore Public Library, Inchicore, Dublin, 1937
 Irish Wire Products Limited (IWP) Factory, Limerick, 1930s
 Kodak House, Rathmines, Dublin, 1930
 Leisureplex bowling alley, Dublin
 Liberty House, Dublin, 1936
 National Library of Ireland administration building, Dublin, 1936
 Pearse House Flats, Dublin, 1933
 Phoenix Cinema, Dingle
 Refuge Assurance Building, Ballinasloe, County Galway, 1935
 The Savoy Theatre (now the Book Centre), Waterford, 1930s
 School of Culinary Arts and Food Technology, Dublin Institute of Technology, Dublin, 1941
 Stella Theatre, Rathmines, Dublin, 1923
 Theatre Royal (the fifth), Dublin, 1935
 Tivoli Theatre, Dublin, 1934
 Watergate Theatre (formerly the Savoy), Kilkenny, 1937

Italy
source: 

 , Milan, 1924
 Albergo diurno Venezia, Venice, 1926
 Bettoja Hotel Mediterraneo, Rome, 1936
  (House and museum), Milan, 1931
  (CASPAS), Rome, 1917
 Cinema Teatro Odeon, Canicattì, Sicily, 1952
 , Crevoladossola, 1925
 Edicola Radice (shrine) in the cemetery of Busto Arsizio, 1919
 Giacomo Arengario restaurant, Museo del Novecento, Milan
  department store, Genoa, 1928
  (Coppedè district), Trieste, Rome, 1915–1927
 Sala della Cheli, Vittoriale degli italiani, Gardone Riviera, Lombardy, 1921–1938
 Stadio Armando Picchi, Livorno, 1935
 Stadio Artemio Franchi, Florence, 1931
 Stadio dei Marmi, Rome, 1928
 Stadio Renato Dall'Ara, Bologna, 1927
 Milano Centrale railway station, Milano, 1931
 , Milan, 1929
 Teatro Metropolitan, Catania, Sicily, 1955
  palazzo, Salsomaggiore Terme, Parma, 1914–1929
 Torrione INA, Brescia, 1932
 , Imperia, 1927
 , Milan, 1935

Latvia 
 Laima Clock, Riga, 1924
 , Riga
 Riga Central Market, Riga, 1930

Lithuania 
Some of the notable Art Deco buildings include:
 Aleksotas Funicular Railway, Kaunas, 1935
 Bank of Lithuania Building, Kaunas, 1939
 Central Post Office (Feliksas Vizbaras), Kaunas, 1932
 Chamber of Commerce, Industry, and Crafts (Vytautas Landsbergis-Žemkalnis), Kaunas, 1938
 Church of the Resurrection, Kaunas, 1941, 2006
 Daina Movie Theatre, Kaunas, 1938
 Firemen's Hall (Edmundas Alfonsas Frykas), Kaunas, 1930
 The Headquarters of the Milk Processing Company Pienocentras, Kaunas, 1934
 Kaunas Garrison Officers' Club Building (Stasys Kudokas), Kaunas
 Kaunas Municipality building (formerly Savings Bank), Kaunas, 1940
 Kaunas Sports Hall (Anatol Rozenblum), Kaunas, 1939
 Kriščiukaitis (Jonas Kova-Kovalskis,) 1937
 M. K. Čiurlionis National Museum of Art, Kaunas, 1921
 Our Lord Jesus Christ's Resurrection Basilica, Kaunas, 1940, 2004
 The Pažanga Company, Kaunas, 1934
 Romuva Cinema, Kaunas
 St. Vincent de Paul Elderly People’s Home, Kaunas, 1940
 State Philharmonic Hall, Kaunas (Edmundas Alfonsas Frykas, 1929), neoclassical style building with bright Art Deco architectural elements
 Vytautas the Great War Museum and M. K. Čiurlionis National Art Museum palace, Kaunas (Vladimir Dubenecki, 1936)

Luxembourg 
  clothing store, Luxembourg City, 1934
 , Luxembourg City, 1932
 , Luxembourg City
  (Church of the Sacred Heart), Esch-Uelzecht, 1932
 , Luxembourg City, 1930
 Former , Esch-sur-Alzette, 1930
  (former cinema), Esch-Uelzecht, 1938
 , Esch-Uelzecht, 1937
 Palais du Mobilier Bonn Frères (furniture store), Luxembourg City, 1926
 , Lycée Guillaume Kroll, Esch-Uelzecht, 1936
 , Luxembourg City, 1927

Malta 
 Blue Arena theatre, Żabbar, 1950s
 former Gżira government primary school, Gżira, 1930s
 Hotel Phoenicia, Floriana, 1930s, 1947
former HSBC Bank (formerly Rialto Cinema), Bormla
 Lombard Bank, Sliema
 Muscats Motors, Gżira, 1945
Palazzina Vincenti, St. Julian's, 1948
Plaza Cinema, Zurrieq, mid-1930s
 Private residence of Joseph Colombo in Triq d'Argens, Gżira, 1936
former Royal Cinema, Victoria, Gozo
Titan International Limited building (formerly Lyric Theatre), Msida, 1930s

Monaco 
18 Boulevarde de Suisse, Monaco
The Victoria building, Monaco

Montenegro 
Podgorica Main Post Office, Podgorica

Netherlands 
 Atlantic Huis, Rotterdam, 1930
 De Baarsjes neighbourhood, Amsterdam
 , Amsterdam, 1935
  apartments, Amsterdam-Zuid, 1920
 Concertgebouw de Vereeniging, Nijmegen, 1914
 Harlingen Lighthouse, Harlingen, Friesland, 1922
 Kraajiveld House, Rotterdam, 1938
 Minnervahuis, Rotterdam, 1937
  church, Scheveningen, 1916
  (New Synagogue), Nijmegen, 1913
 Pathe City (formerly City Theater), Amsterdam, 1935
 , Mauritshuis Museum, The Hague, 1930
 Prins Hendrik Barracks (former barracks), Nijmegen, 1911
 Radio Kootwijk, Apeldoorn, 1922
 Scheepvaarthuis, Amsterdam, 1916, 1928
 Tuschinsky Theater, Amsterdam, 1921
 Vleeschhouwerij, Weesp
 , Tilburg, 1914

Norway 
 Arbeiderpartibygningen (Labor Party headquarters), Oslo, 1929–1935
 Folketeateret, Oslo, 1935
  cultural center, Tofte, 1930
 Forum Kino, Bergen, 1936
 Oslo Rådhus (City Hall), Oslo, 1931-1950
 , Sauda, Rogaland, 1930
  department store, Oslo, 1930
 Studentersamfundet i Trondhjem, Trondheim, 1927

Poland 

  (Professors' House), Jagiellonian University, Kraków, 1931
 Dom Centralny (Central House), Zamość, 1911
Diaknostyka (Diagnostics and Medical Laboratories), Cieszyn
 Gdynia City Hall (formerly ZUS Building), Gdynia, 1936
Higher School of Health Promotion recruitment center (Krakowska Wyższa Szkoła Promocji Zdrowia Rekrutacja), Krakow
HSW Building (Huta Stalowa Wola), Stalowa Wola, 1938
  (Chamber of Crafts organization building), Poznań, 1929
 , Łódź, 1939
 Jastrzębiec Villa, 1933
 , Kraków, 1926
 , Kraków, 1935
 Narrow Gauge Railway Museum (Muzeum Kolei Wąskotorowej w Sochaczewie, former railway station), Sochaczew, 1920s
 Olympic Stadium, Wrocław, 1928
 ), Łódź, 1928
 , Wrocław, 1928 (in Polish)
 , Łódź, 1928
 , Łódź, 1951
 Renoma Department Store, Wrocław, 1930
 Steelwork General Directorate Building, Stalowa Wola, 1938
 Teatr Muzyczny Capitol, Wrocław, 1930

Warsaw 
 Campus of SGH Warsaw School of Economics (Building A and Library), Warsaw, 1925-1931
 , Warsaw
  (former professors' cooperative housing of the Wolna Wszechnica, Free University), Warsaw
 78 Wawelska Street, Kolonia Lubeckiego, Warsaw
 A. & M. Orlowscy Tenement House, Warsaw, 1939
 BGK Building and Cafe Cyganeria, Warsaw, 1936–1939
 Franciszka Glasenappowa Tenement House, Warsaw, 1938
 Kazimierz Kolinski Tenement House, Warsaw
 Krenski Company Tenement House, Warsaw, 1939
 Mauzoleum Walki i Męczeństwa (Mausoleum of Struggle and Martyrdom), Warsaw, 1952
 , Warsaw, 1912
  (Polish Ministry of National Education building), Warsaw, 1918
 , Stacji Filtrów ( at the Museum of Water Supply and Sewerage at the Lindley Filter Station), Warsaw
 Ośrodek Studiów Wschodnich (Centre for Eastern Studies), Warsaw
 Prudential building in Warsaw, Warsaw, 1933
Sejm and Senate Complex, Parliament of Poland, Warsaw, 1928
Telephone and Telegraph Building (Telefon Miedzymiastowy Telegraf Radiotelegraf), Warsaw
Trade Union of Local Government Employees (Zwiazek Zaw Pracownikow Samorzadu Terytorialnego), Warsaw
 Warsaw Airport Arrivals Hall, Warsaw, 1934

Portugal 

Algarcines de Lagos (formerly the Império Cine), Lagos, Algarve, 1930s
Apartments and offices at 73 and 83 R. Alexandre Herculano Viseu, Centro
Bus Station (Ernesto Camilo Korrodi), Caldas da Rainha, Oeste, 1949
 Café Central, Santarém, Alentejo, 1937
Cine-Theater, Sobral de Monte Agraço, Greater Lisbon District
 Cinema Carlos Alberto, Sintra, Greater Lisbon District
 Cinema da Ponta do Sol, Ponta do Sol, Madeira, 1933
Commercial building at Avenida José da Costa Mealha 94, Loulé, Faro, Algarve
Edificio O Coreto, Loulé, Faro, Algarve
Emporium Apartment building, Porto, 1940s
Grocery store at 24 Largo General Humberto Delgado, Viseu, Centro
Loulé Coreto Hotel, Loulé, Faro, Algarve
, Chamusca, Santarém, Alentejo, 1942
Portarade Suites Hotel and Restaurant, Ferragundo, Lagoa, Algarve
 , Santarém, Alentejo, 1937
Tribunal Judicial da Comarca de Faro – Secção Central (County Courthouse), Faro, Algarve, 1930s

Coimbra 

Alfarelos/Granja do Ulmeiro station, Granja do Ulmeiro, Soure, Coimbra, Central
Associação Humanitária de Bombeiros Voluntários de Coimbra, Coimbra
Auto-Industrial, SA - Opel and Isuzu, Coimbra
Biblioteca Geral, University of Coimbra General Library, Coimbra
Commercial building at R. João Machado 31, Coimbra
Commercial building at Av. Fernão de Magalhães 133, Coimbra
Hotel Mondego, Coimbra, 1930s
 (Secondary School), Coimbra, Central, 1928

Funchal 

Casa de Saúde da Carreira, São Pedro, Funchal, Madeira
Casa do Dr. Walter Belmonte, Funchal, Madeira, 1945
Cliff elevator at Rua Portao Sao Tiago, Funchal, Madeira
Hospital Dr. João de Almada, Funchal, Madeira, 1940
 Hotel Galerias Jardins da Ajuda, Funchal, Madeira
 Lar Santa Isabel nursing home (former hospital), Funchal, Madeira, 1936
Liceu de Jaime Moniz (Escola Secundária Jaime Moniz), Funchal, Madeira, 1946
Mercado dos Lavradores, Funchal, Madeira, 1940
Oudinot Shopping Center, Funchal, Madeira
Slaughterhouse (Matadouro), Funchal, Madeira

Lisbon 

 42 Campo Pequeno Street, Lisbon
 168–170 Avenida da Liberdade, Lisbon
A Barraca theatre (formerly Teatro Cinearte), Lisbon, 1938
Apartments at Avenida António Augusto de Aguiar, Saldanha, Lisbon, 1930s
Apartments at corner of R. Fialho de Almeida and Av. Pedro Álvares Cabral, Lisbon
Apartments at Av. Praia da Vitória 50, Lisbon
Apartments at 169, 171, 175, 179, 183, and 185 Rua do Salitre, Rato, Lisbon
 Café A Brasileira, Lisbon, 1905, 1922
 Cais do Sodré Railway Station, (Pardal Monteiro), Lisbon, 1928
 Capitólio Cinema, (Cristino da Silva), Lisbon, 1931
 Casa Gardénia, Lisbon, 1993
Cine Imperio, Lisbon, 1947-1952
Cinema Batalha (formerly Cinema High Life), Portugal, 1947
Cinema Paris, Lisbon, 1931
  (newspaper), Lisbon, 1940
  (River station), Lisbon, 1932
Estação Marítima da Rocha do Conde de Óbidos, Estrela (Maritime station, ship terminal), Lisbon
 Garage Liz, Lisbon, 1933
  (port building), Alcântara, Lisboa, 1943–1948
  (port building), Cais da Rocha, 1934
Hard Rock Cafe (formerly Condes Cinema), Lisbon, 1927
  (Our Lady of Fatima church, Pardal Monteiro), Lisbon, 1938
Instituto Nacional de Estatística (National Institute for Statistics - Statistics Portugal), Lisbon, 1935
 , Lisbon, 1927
Jardim do Ultramar (Botanical Garden) buildings, Belém, Lisbon
 , Lisbon, 1946
 National Statistics Institute, (Pardal Monteiro), Lisbon, 1930
Teatro Capitólio, Parque Mayer, Lisbon, 1931
Teatro Eden, (now Hotel Eden, Cassiano Branco), Lisbon, 1932
Teatro Maria Vitória, Parque Mayer, Lisbon, 1922
 Vitória Labor Center of the Portuguese Communist Party (formerly Hotel Vitória, Cassiano Branco), Lisbon, 1936
  (School of Law), Lisbon, 1952
  (School of Literature), Lisbon, 1952
 , Lisbon, 1952

Porto 

  department store, Porto, 1936
 Casa de Serralves, (Marques da Silva), Porto, 1940
 Cinema Batalha, Porto, 1947
Cine Teatro Julio Deniz, Porto, 1930s
Cine-Teatro Vale Formoso, Porto, late 1940s
 Club Fluvial Portuense, Porto, 1933
 Coliseum of Porto, Porto, 1941
 Edifício d'O Comércio (now Banco Internacional do Funchal), Porto
  (formerly Cafe Imperial, now McDonald's) Porto
 Estação de serviços (Service Station and Maus Hábitos cultural organization), Rua de Passos Manuel, Porto, 1939
 , Porto, 1932
 Garage on Rua de Passos Manuel, Porto
 Hotel Vincci, Porto, 1934
  (Transportation kiosk), Santo Ildefonso, Porto, 2017
 Rivoli Theatre, (Júlio Brito), Porto, 1923

Romania
source: 
 Academic College (Casa Universitarilor), Cluj-Napoca, 1937
 , Cluj-Napoca, 1924
Cinema Victoria, Cluj-Napoca
, Mamaia, 1936
Unitarian Church, Braşov

Bucharest 
 Apartments at 127 Calea Moșilor, Bucharest
 Palace of the Society of Civil Servants), Bucharest, 1934
 , (former Patria Cinema) Bucharest, 1931
 ASIROM Vienna Insurance building (formerly Fostul Hotel), Bucharest, 1930s
 Athénée Palace Hilton, Bucharest, 1914
Building at 13, Strada Piața Amzei, Bucharest
Capitol Cinema, Bucharest, 1912, 1938
Cinema Aro (formerly Scala Cinema), Bucharest, 1937
Cinematograf Europa, Bucharest, 1935
 Corneliu Coposu House, Bucharest
 , Bucharest
 Gara de Nord (Bucharest North Railway Station), Bucharest, 1928
, Bucharest, 1939
 , Bucharest, 1930
 Hotel Negoiu (now Banco Turco), Bucharest, 1929
 Hotel Opera, Bucharest, 1934
 , Bucharest, 1931
 House of Magistrates, Bucharest, 1937
, Bucharest, 1937
 Palatul Societății Funcționarilor Publici (Palace of the Society of Civil Servants), Bucharest, 1034
  Culturale (Palace of the Cultural League), Bucharest, 1929
  (Palace of State Monopolies), Bucharest, 1931–1941
 Palatul Telefoanelor, (Telephone Palace), Bucharest, 1934
 (Tănase Theatre), Bucharest, 1919, 1945
Villa Solly Gold, Bucharest, 1934
 Volo Hotel, Bucharest

Constanța 
Bloc A4, Bulevardul Ferdinand, Constanța
Acord apartment building, Constanța
Apartments at 26, 40, 48, 52 and 54 Bulevardul Ferdinand, Constanța
Arpinav offices, Bulevardul Ferdinand, Constanța 
Buildings at 56, 78 and 80 Bulevardul Tomis, Constanța
Casino Mamaia, Constanța
CFR Călători Train Station office, Bulevardul Ferdinand, Constanța 
Constanța Train Station, Constanța 
Gara C.F. Maritimă, Constanța 
Hotel Ferdinand, Constanța 
Lupamed/Cardiomed, Bulevardul Ferdinand, Constanța 
Radio Sky offices, Bulevardul Ferdinand, Constanța 
Restaurant Scapino, Bulevardul Ferdinand, Constanța
Romned Port Operator Storage building, Constanța

Russia 
 Aeroport Metro Station, Moscow, 1938
 Army staff building, Novobirisk Krasny
 , Moscow, 1935
 Hotel Astoria, St. Petersburg, 1912
 Hotel Astoria (Hotel Volga), Saratov, 1917
 , Moscow, 1930s
 Mayakovskaya Metro station, Moscow, 1938
 , Moscow, 1934
 , Moscow, 1953
 Oreanda Hotel, Yalta, 1907
 State Archive of the Russian Federation, Moscow
 Stokvartirny House (The 100-Flat Building), Novosibirsk, 1937
 , Moscow, 1933
 , Moscow, 1938–1951

Serbia 
 Agrarian Bank Building, Belgrade, 1934
 Air Force Command Building, Belgrade, 1935
 Cvijeta Zuzorić Art Pavilion, Belgrade, 1928
 Embassy of France (by Roger-Henri Expert), Belgrade, 1929
 Ethnographic Museum, Belgrade
 Faculty of Law, University of Belgrade, Belgrade, 1936–1940
  (Igman's Palace), Belgrade, 1938
 Palace Albanija, Belgrade, 1940
 Pension Fund Building (now Theatre-on-Terazije), Belgrade, 1939
 PRIZAD building, Belgrade, 1937
 Serbian Journalists’ Association Building, Vračar, Belgrade, 1934

Slovakia 
 , Lermontovova, Bratislava, 1924
General Post Office, Košice, 1930
 Heydukova Street Synagogue, Bratislava, 1926
  (August 29 Street), Bratislava, 1925
Kino Choč, Donly Kubin
Metropol Building - Metropol Cafe, Bratislava, 1928
  ("The two lions building"- "U dvoch levov"), Bratislava, 1922
 Post Office (formerly ), Trenčianske Teplice
 , Bratislava, 1923
 Trenčianske Teplice hydroelectric power plant, Trenčianske Teplice, 1920
 , Bratislava, 1921
Unicredit Bank, Martin, 1940
Vúb Bank, Martin
 , Bratislava, 1921

Slovenia 
 Nebotičnik skyscraper, Ljubljana (1933)

Spain
source: 
 , Gijón, Asturias
 19 Calle Císter, Málaga, Andalusia, 1927
 , Gijón, Asturias
  y Licenciado Poza, Bilbao
 , Bilbao, 1924
 , Cartagena, Murcia, 1995
 Caja General de Ahorros de Ferrol (General Savings Bank of Ferrol), Ferrol, Galicia, 1934
 Caja Rural de Soria, Soria, Castilla y León
 Casa Blanca, Oviedo, Asturias, 1932
 Centro de Estudios Públicos Luis Briñas, Santutxu, Bilbao, 1933
 Colegio de la Asunción, Málaga, Andalusia, 1950
 , Bilbao, 1935
 ), Sevilla, 1930
 , Vigo, Galicia, 1939
 Edificio Sanchón, Vigo, Pontevedra, Galicia, 1935
 , Seville, Andalusia, 1910
 , Santander, Cantabria, 1931
 former Farmacia Méndez, Málaga, Andalusia, 1952
 , Vitoria, Álava, 1935
 , Córdoba, 1932
 , Sotrondio, San Martín del Rey Aurelio, Asturias, 1930

Alicante Province 
 Cine Astoria, Alicante, 1930s
 , Alcoy, 1949
 , Alicante, 1936
 , Alicante, 1935
 , Cocentaina, Alicante Province, 1931
 , Alicante, 1929
 , Alicante, 1942
 , Alicante, 1942
 San Jorge Bridge, Alcoy, Alicante Province, 1931

Barcelona Province 
 , Barcelona, 1947
  (Casa China), Barcelona, 1929
 Casa Lluís Ferrer-Vidal, Barcelona, 1916
 Jorba Building, Manresa, Bages, Barcelona Province
 , Barcelona, 1930
 Phenomena Experience Room (formerly Cinestudio Napoles, Cine Napols), Barcelona, 1962
 , Barcelona, 1931

Madrid 
 10 Juan de Austria, Madrid
 25 Bustamante, Madrid
 27 Marcelino Camacho, Madrid
 45 Calle de Alcalá (formerly Banco de Vizcaya building), Madrid, 1934
 49 Altamirano, Madrid
 52 Gran Vía, Juzgados de lo Contencioso-Administrativo y de Primera Instancia. Madrid, 1931
 Capitol Building/Edificio Carrión, Madrid, 1933
 Casa de las Flores, Madrid, 1930
 Central Telefónica, Tetuán, Madrid
 Centro Cultural Nicolás Salmerón, Madrid, 1933
 , Madrid, 1930
 Cine Bilbao (now ), Madrid, 1925
 Cine Callao interior, Madrid, 1927
 , Madrid, 1933
 Cine Doré (now Filmoteca Española), Madrid, 1925
 , Madrid, 1928
  (Teatro Coliseum), Madrid, 1933
 Edificio Serrano 37, Madrid
 , Madrid, 1931
 Hotel Vincci Centrum, Madrid, 1928
 Teatro Pavón, Madrid, 1925

Melilla 
 , Melilla, 1935
 , Melilla, 1934
 , Melilla, 1932
 , Melilla, 1932
 ,  1932
 , Melilla, 1938
 , Melilla, 1936
 , Melilla, 1936
 , 1932
 , Melilla, 1944
 , Melilla, 1935
 , Melilla, 1943
 , Melilla, 1935
 El Corte Inglés shopping center, Plaça de Catalunya, Barcelona
 , Melilla, 1941
 , Melilla, 1932
 , (Town Hall). Melilla, 1935–1943
 , Melilla, 1949

Valencia Province 
 , Sueca, Valencia Province, 1929
  (Carlos Gens hydraulic pumps factory), Valencia, 1930
 , Valencia, 1930
 , Valencia, 1930
 , Valencia, 1934
 , Valencia, 1939
 , Valencia, 1934–1954
 , Valencia, 1940
 , Valencia, 1934
 , Valencia, 1931
 , Valencia, 1933
 , Valencia, 1931
 , Valencia, 1929
 , Valencia, 1943
 , Valencia, 1936
 , Valencia, 1944
 , Valencia, 1928
 , Valencia, 1933
 , Gandía, Valencia Province, 1934
 , Valencia, 1939–1948
 , Carlet, Valencia Province, 1934
 , Universidad de Valencia, Valencia, 1908–1944
 Sociedad Recreativa la Agricultura, Sueca, Valencia Province, 1930s
 , Sueca, Valencia Province, 1934

Sweden 
  (Royal Cinema), Stockholm, 1940
 Biografen Manhattan, Stockholm, 1935
 , Rival Hotel, Stockholm, 1937
Nojeastern (formerly Amiralen Teatern), Malmo, 1940
Saga Cinema, Stockholm, 1937

Switzerland 
  (stock exchange building), Zürich, 1930
 Beau-Rivage Palace, Lausanne
 Capitol Cinema, Bern, 1929 (theater hall, interior decoration)
 Genève-Cornavin railway station, Geneva, 1858, 1931
 Lausanne Palace, Lausanne
 , Berne, 1929
 Palace of Nations, Geneva, 1938
 , Lausanne, 1932

Turkey 
 Ankara railway station, Ankara, 1937
 Bilecik Central Station, Bilecik
 Bursa Merinos Central Station, Bursa
  (General Directorate of Foundations), İzmir, 1931
 Court of Cassation - Supreme Court of Appeals of Turkey, Ankara, 1935
 İşbank Tower 1, Levent, Istanbul, 2000
  store at the Spice Bazaar, Istanbul
 School of Language and History-Geography, Ankara University, Ankara, 1950
 Sivas Central Station, Sivas, 1934
 Süreyya Opera House, Kadıköy, Istanbul, 1927
 , Istanbul, 1939

Ukraine 
 4 Osmomysla Street, Drohobych
 Foxtrot Shopping Center, Odesa
 Ratusha (Ivano-Frankivsk), Ivano-Frankivsk, 1935
 Oreanda Hotel, Yalta, 1907, 1950s
 Peremoha Cinema, Mukachevo
 Town Hall, Rynok Square, Ivano-Frankivsk, Ivano-Frankivsk Oblast
 UKR Telecom, 37 Katerynyns'ka Street, Odesa

Kharkiv
 5  (former headquarters of DonUgol Trust (Coal of Donbas)), Kharkiv, 1925
 , Kharkiv, 1928
 9 Constitution Street, Kharkiv, 1925
  (formerly the Chervonozavodsky Theater), Kharkiv, 1931
 Metalist Oblast Sports Complex, Kharkiv, 1926–1940
 Ministry of Culture, Kharkiv, 1931

Kyiv
 15/5 Instytutska Street, Kyiv, 1941
 3/25 Symona Petliury Street, Kyiv
 38 Bohdana Khmelnytskoho Street, Kyiv, 1936
 7–9 , Kyiv Λ
 7/29 Tarasa Shevchenka Boulevard, Kyiv, 1912
 Crypt at Baikovo Cemetery, Kyiv
 5a Pyrohova Street, Kyiv
 National Museum-Reserve of the Battle for Kyiv in 1943, Kyiv
 TSUM department store, Kyiv

Lviv
 10 Kovzhuna Street, Lviv, 1924
 , (now Heavenly B&B), Lviv, 1925
 8 Karmanskoho Street, Lviv, 1923
 9 Repina Street, Lviv
 Mazanczow House, Lviv, 1923
 , Lviv, 1924
 Tomb of Henryk Perier, Lviv
 Tomb of Komorowski and Stroński families at Lychakiv Cemetery, Lviv, 1929

United Kingdom 
 Ocean liners ,  and 
 The Rock Hotel, Gibraltar, 1932

England 
 44-46 Park Street, Walsall, West Midlands, 1929
 78 Derngate, Northampton, 1917
 Addington Health Centre, West Wickham, South London
 Arts Theatre, Cambridge, Cambridgeshire, 1936
 Beehive, Gatwick Airport, Crawley, West Sussex, 1936
 Bishopstone Railway Station, Seaford, East Sussex, 1938
 Bradford Odeon, Bradford, West Yorkshire, 1930
 Bristol Temple Meads railway station, Redcliffe, Bristol, 1935
 British Heart Foundation building, Congleton, Cheshire
 Brynmor Jones Library, University of Hull, Kingston upon Hull, Yorkshire, 1950s
 former Burton's, The Parade, Royal Leamington Spa, Warwickshire, 1930
 former Burton's (now Sainsbury's), Bristol
 former Burton's, Cheltenham, Gloucestershire
 former Burton's, Hanley, Stoke-on-Trent, Staffordshire
 Caxton Theatre, Grimsby, North East Lincolnshire
 Charters House, Sunningdale, Berkshire, 1938
 Chester Storyhouse, Cheshire, North West England, 1936
 The Chocolate Works of Terry's of York, York, 1926
 City Hall, Norwich (Charles Holloway James & Stephen Rowland Pierce), Norwich, East Anglia, 1938
 City Hall entertainment venue, Salisbury, Wiltshire, 1937
 Clipper Schooner pub, Great Yarmouth, Norfolk, 1938
 Coate Water Country Park, Swindon, Wiltshire
 Connaught Theatre, Worthing, West Sussex, 1914, 1935
 The Deco Cinema, Northampton, Northamptonshire, 1936
 The Deco Pub, Southsea, Portsmouth, Hampshire
 De La Warr Pavilion, Bexhill on Sea, East Sussex, 1935
 The Diamond Cinema, Wolverhampton, West Midlands, 1937
 Druid Street Industrial (formerly Moore & Osbourne hosiery factory), Hinckley, Leicestershire, 1932
 former Electricity Board Showroom, Grimsby Road, Cleethorpes, Lincolnshire, 1937
 Ellen Terry Arts and Media Building, Coventry, West Midlands
 Embassy Theatre, Peterborough, Cambridgeshire, 1937
 Factory frontage (former Sheffield Forgemasters, British Steel), Sheffield, South Yorkshire
 Felixstowe Palace, Felixstowe, Suffolk
 , Felixstowe, Suffolk
 Futurist Cinema, Basford, Nottingham, Nottinghamshire, 1937
 Globe Theatre, Stockton-on-Tees, Durham, 1938
 Grand National (roller coaster), Blackpool Pleasure Beach, Blackpool, Lancashire, 1935
 Hastings railway station, Hastings, East Sussex, 1931
 Holyoake Hall, Headington, Oxford, 1938
 Horsham railway station, Horsham, West Sussex, 1938
 Inorganic Chemistry Laboratory, University of Oxford
 John Haider Building, Bath Street, Hereford, Herefordshire
 Jubilee Pool, Penzance, Cornwall, South west England, 1935
 Kingsway Health Center, Widnes, Halton, Cheshire, 1939
 Leamington Spa railway station, Royal Leamington Spa, Warwickshire, 1939
 Leicester Athena (formerly Odeon Cinema), Leicester City Centre, Leicestershire, 1936
 Majestic Cinema, Brignorth, Shropshire, 1937
 Majestic Theatre, Darlington, Durham, 1932
 Manor Road Garage, East Preston, Littlehampton, West Sussex
 Marine Court, St. Leonards-on-Sea, Hastings, East Sussex, 1938
 Marine Villa, Shanklin, Isle of Wight
 Mecca Bingo Hall (formerly the Regal Cinema), Watford, 1913, 1932
 Middle Brook Centre (formerly Hope Church), Winchester, Hampshire
 Midland Hotel, Morecambe, Lancashire, 1933
 Never Turn Back pub, Caister-on-Sea, Norfolk, 1956
 former Odeon Cinema, Dudley, West Midlands, 1937
 former Odeon Cinema, Hanley, Stoke-on-Trent, Staffordshire
 Odeon Cinema, Hereford, Herefordshire, West Midlands
 Odeon Cinemas (now Funny Girls bar), Dickson Road, Blackpool, Lancashire, 1939
 Peterborough Lido, Peterborough, Cambridgeshire, 1936
 Queen's Court, Bristol, 1937
 The Regal Cinema, (Archibald Hurley Robinson), Evesham, 1932
 former The Regal Cinema and Gala Bingo Hall, Cowley Road, Oxford, 1937
 Ritz Cinema, Nuneaton, Nuneaton and Bedworth, Warwickshire, 1937
 former Rivoli Picture House, Sandown, Isle of Wight
 San Remo Towers, Boscombe, Bournemouth, Christchurch and Poole
 Savoy Cinema, Nottingham, Nottinghamshire, 1935
 Seaton Carew bus station, Hartlepool, Durham, North East England, 1930s
 Sheffield Central Library, Sheffield, South Yorkshire, 1929
 Showroom Cinema, Sheffield, South Yorkshire, 1936
 Shrubs Wood, Chalfont St. Giles, Buckinghamshire, 1934
 Southfields Branch Library, Leicester, Leicestershire, 1939
 Southampton Civic Centre, Southampton, Hampshire, 1932–1937
 St. Barnabas Library, Leicester, Leicestershire, 1937
 St. Hugh's Church, Scunthorpe, North Lincolnshire, 1939
 Storyhouse Theatre & Cinema, Chester, Cheshire, 1936
 Stoke Abbott Court, Worthing, West Sussex
 Superdrug building, Macclesfield, Cheshire
 Sywell Aerodome, Sywell, Northamtonshire
 Westcliffe Buildings, Barton on Sea, Hampshire
 Winter Gardens, Blackpool, Lancashire, 1878, 1920
 Worthing Pier, Worthing, West Sussex, 1935
  St. Austell Brewery Ales, Penzance, Cornwall

Birmingham 
 The Alexandra, Birmingham, 1938
 Barber Institute of Fine Arts, Birmingham, West Midlands, 1939
 former Burton's, Erdington, Birmingham, West Midlands
 Clifton Bingo (former Odeon Cinema Perry Barr), Birmingham, 1938
 Elmdon Building, Birmingham International Airport, Birmingham
 Empire Cinemas (former Oden Cinema), Sutton Coldfield, 1936
 former Mothers Club, Erdington, Birmingham,
 General Electric Company, Aston, Birmingham, 1920
 Golden Eagle, Birmingham, 1930s (demolished)
 Harborne Baths, Birmingham, 1923
 Kent House (formerly Kent Street Baths), Birmingham, 1933
 Medical School, University of Birmingham, 1938
 Oak Cinema, Selly Oak, Birmingham, 1923 (demolished)
 Odeon Cinema, Kingstanding, Birmingham, 1962
 Petersfield Court, Hall Green, Birmingham, 1937
 former Times Furnishing Company (now Waterstone's), Birmingham, 1938

Brighton 
 ABC Cinema, Brighton, East Sussex, 1930
 Brighton Marina, Brighton
 Embassy Court, Brighton, East Sussex, 1935
 Freemasons Tavern and Brewery, Hove, Brighton and Hove, East Sussex, 1928
 Grosvenor Casino, Brighton, East Sussex
 Marine Gate, Brighton, 1939
 Patcham Clock Tower, Patcham, Brighton and Hove, 1930s
 Saltdean Lido, Brighton, 1938
 Van Alen Building, Brighton, 2001
 White Cliffs Cafe, Brighton, 1937

Cumbria 
former Burton's, Whitehaven, Cumbria
The Bus Station, Whitehaven, Cumbria, 1931
Eden Rural Foyer Sfere (formerly Regent Cinema), Penrith, Cumbria, 1933 Endymion House, Millbeck, Keswich, Cumbria, 1930s
John Whinnerah Institute, Barrow-in-Furness, Cumbria, 1938
 Roxy Cinema (now Hollywood Nightclub), Barrow-in-Furness, Cumbria, 1937
Workington Opera House, Workington, Cumbria, 1930

Dorset 
Immanuel Church, Southbourne, Dorset
Odeon Landsdowne, Bournemouth, Dorset, 1937
Pier Bandstand, Weymouth Bay, Dorset, 1939
Playhouse & Galaxy Cinema (formerly Palace Court Theatre), Bournemouth, Dorset, 1931
 Plaza Cinema, Dorchester, Dorset, 1933
 Poole Civic Centre, Poole, Dorset, 1932
 Premier Inn, Bournemouth, Dorset
Roxy Cinema, Bournemouth, Dorset, 1911, 1938
Westover Super Cinema, Bournemouth, Dorset, 1937

Devon 
 Burgh Island Hotel, Burgh Island, Devon, 1927
 Casa del Rio, Newton Ferrers, South Hams, Devon, 1936
 Central Cinema, Barnstaple, North Devon, 1931
Holsworthy Amateur Theatre Society HATS Theatre, Holsworthy, Devon, 1947
 House of Fraser (formerly Dingle's Department Store), Plymouth, Devon
 Pearl Assurance House, Plymouth, Devon
Sunpark, Higher Brixham, Devon, 1935
 Tinside Lido, Plymouth, Devon, 1935
 Zenith House (formerly Motor Mecca, Barton Motor Company, and Kastners Garage) Exeter, Devon, 1933

Hertfordshire 
 former Addis Factory, Hertford, Hertfordshire
 Broadway Cinema, Letchworth, Hertfordshire, 1936
 Comet Public House, Hatfield, Welwyn Hatfield, Hertfordshire
 Essoldo Court apartments (formerly Essoldo Watford Theatre), Watford, 1913, 1932
Odyssey Cinema, St Albans (Percival Blow, James Martin Hatfield, Kemp & Tasker) St. Albans, Hertfordshire, 1931
 The Rex Cinema (David Evelyn Nye) Berkhamsted, Hertfordshire, 1938
 West Herts College, Watford, Hertfordshire, 1938

Essex 
Century Cinema, Clacton-on-Sea, Essex, 1936
 Cliffs Pavilion, Westcliff-on-Sea, Essex, 1930s
Hotel Monico, Canvey Island, Essex, 1938
Labworth Cafe, Canvey Island, Essex, 1932
Liquor Lounge, Clacton-on-Sea, Essex
 Odeon Cinema, Colchester, Essex
 St. George's Church, Brentwood, Essex, 1931

Kent 
 Dreamland Margate Cinema, Margate, Kent, 1923
 Halifax Bank (formerly National Westminster Bank), Chatham, Medway, Kent
 Margate railway station, Margate, Thanet, Kent, 1926
 Mayfair Court, Clifftown Gardens, Herne Bay, Kent, 1935
 RAF West Malling Air Traffic Control Tower, Tonbridge and Malling, Kent
 Sun Trap House, Grand Drive, Herne Bay, Kent, 1935
 Thanet School of Art (Kent Education Committee), Margate, Thanet, Kent, 1928
 Thimblemill Library, Smethwick, Sandwell, West Midlands, 1937
 W.T. Henley Building (Cable Works), Northfleet, Gravesham, Kent
 , St. Margaret's-at-Cliffe, Kent

Leeds 
 ABC Cinema, Wakefield, West Yorkshire, 1935
 Electronic and Electrical Engineering Building, University of Leeds, Leeds, West Yorkshire
 Institute of Pathology, St. George's Road, Leeds, West Yorkshire
 Leeds General Infirmary, Brotherton Wing, Leeds, West Yorkshire, 1940
 Leeds Media Centre, Leeds, West Yorkshire, 1934
 The New Inn, Gildersome, Leeds, West Yorkshire, 1934
 Parkinson Building, University of Leeds, Leeds, 1951
 Queens Hotel, Leeds Leeds, West Yorkshire, 1937
 Vake Cinema, Mirfield, West Yorkshire, 1939

Liverpool 
 ABC Cinema (former Forum Cinema), Liverpool, 1931
 Blacklers Department Store, Liverpool, 1941, 1953
 Bryant and May match factory in Speke, Liverpool
 Crowne Plaza Liverpool John Lennon Airport Hotel, (former Air Control Tower and terminal), Liverpool, 1930s
 David Lloyd Sports Centre, Liverpool
 Granada Cinema, Dovecot, Liverpool, 1932
 Greenbank Drive Synagogue, Sefton Park, Liverpool, 1936
 Harold Cohen Library, University of Liverpool, Liverpool, 1938
 Liverpool Meat and Fish Market, Tue Brook, 1931
 Littlewoods Pools building, Liverpool, 1938
 Old Co-operative Building (now student housing), Liverpool, 1937
 Philharmonic Hall, Liverpool, 1939
 Queensway Tunnel, River Mersey, Liverpool to Birkenhead, 1934
 Ritz Roller Rink, Liverpool, 1937
 Royal Court Theatre, Liverpool, 1938
 Skyways House (headquarters of Shop Direct Group), Old Terminal, John Lennon Airport, Liverpool, 1930s

London
 1 and 3 Hill Crescent Coldblow, Bexley, London
 2, 4, and 6 Valencia Road, Stanmore, Harrow, London, 1932
 14 The Avenue Home, Hampton, Richmond upon Thames, London
 Adhesive Specialities Ltd Building, Ladywell, Lewisham
 Alaska Building, Bermondsey, Southwark, London, 1930s
 Arnos Grove tube station, Arnos Grove, Enfield, 1932
 Arsenal Stadium (East and West Stands), Highbury, Islington, London (Claude Waterlow Ferrier, 1932–36)
 Balmoral Court flats, South Norwood Hill, Croydon
 Broadway Theatre, Catford, Lewisham, London, 1932
 Bromley Picturehouse (formerly Odeon Theatre), Bromley, London, 1936
 Carlton Cinema, Essex Road, Islington, London, 1922
 Chessington North railway station, Kingston upon Thames, London, 1939
Chilterns Apartments, Sutton, London
 Cholmley Lodge, Haringay, London, 1934
 Colliers Wood tube station, Colliers Wood, Merton, 1926
 Coronet pub and former cinema, Holloway, Islington, London
 Croydon Airport, Croydon, 1928
 Dagenham Roundhouse, Dagenham, Barking and Dagenham, London, 1936
 De Bohun Primary School, Southgatem Enfield, London, 1936
 Eastcote tube station, Eastcote, Hillingdon, London, 1939
 Elm Park Court, Harrow, London, 1936
 Embassy Cinema (Mayfair Venue), Chadwell Heath, Redbridge, London, 1934
 Forest Croft and Taymount Grange, Forest Hill, Lewisham, London, 1937
 Gants Hill tube station, Ilford, Redbridge, London, 1947
 Gaumont State Cinema, (George Coles), Kilburn, Brent, London, 1937
 The Grampians, Shepherd's Bush, Hammersmith and Fulham, London, 1937
 Grange Park Methodist Church, Grange Park, Enfield, 1938
 Gwynne House, Whitechapel, Tower Hamlets, London, 1938
 Hammersmith Apollo, Hammersmith, Hammersmith and Fulham, London, 1932
 Hillingdon Sports and Leisure Complex, Uxbridge, Hillingdon, London, 1935
 Ibex House, Tower Hamlets, London, 1937
 Islington Assembly Hall, Islington, London, 1930
 Isokon building Apartment Building, (Wells Coates), Lawn Road, Hampstead, London, 1933–34
 Ivory Lounge, Bexleyheath, Bexley, London
 Kingsley Court, Willesden Green, Brent, London, 1933
 Lichfield Court, Richmond, Richmond upon Thames, London, 1935
 Limehouse: The Mission, Tower Hanmlets, London, 1923
 Millennium Mills, West Silvertown, Newham, London, 1934
 Mortlake Crematorium, Kew, Richmond upon Thames, London, 1939
 Odeon Cinema, Richmond upon Thames, London, 1930
 Oxo Tower, South Bank, Southwark, London, 1929
 Pinner Court, Harrow, London, 1935
 Poplar Baths, Poplar, Tower Hamlets, London, 1933
 Poplar OLD Town Hall, Tower Hamlets, London
 Prince's Tower, Rotherhithem, Southwark, London, 1980s
 Queen Elizabeth II Stadium, Enfield, London, 1953
 Rainbow Theatre (formerly Astoria Theatre), Finsbury Park, Haringey, London, 1930
 Randalls of Uxbridge department store, Uxbridge, Hillingdon, London, 1938
 Redbridge tube station, Ilford, Redbridge, London, 1947
 Rex Cinema, Bethnal Green, Tower Hamlets, London, 1913, 1938
 Richmond station, Richmond, Richmond upon Thames, London, 1937
 Rio Cinema, Dalston, Hackey, London, 1909, 1933
 Royal Masonic Hospital, Ravenscourt Park, Hammersmith, London, 1933
 Secombe Theatre, Sutton, London, 1937, 1983
 South Wimbledon tube station, Wimbledon, Merton, London, 1926
 Southgate tube station, Southgate, Enfield, London, 1933
 Springfield Court flats, Springfield Gardens, Upminster, Havering, London, 1930s
 St. Helier Hospital, Sutton, Carshalton, London, 1934
 St Olaf House (Harry Stuart Goodhart-Rendel), London Bridge, Southwark, London 1929–1931
 St. Patrick's Church, Barking, Barking and Dagenham, London, 1940
 Surbiton railway station, Surbiton, Kingston upon Thames, London, 1937
 Tabard House, Richmond upon Thames, London
 Time Building, Harrow, London
 Towers Cinema, Hornchurch, Havering, London, 1935 (demolished)
 Troxy Cinema, Stepney, Tower Hamlets, London, 1932
Uxbridge tube station, Uxbridge, Hillington, London, 1938
 Waltham Forest Town Hall, Wathamstow, Waltham Forest, London, 1941
 Walthamstow Stadium, Waltham Forest, London, 1933
 Wembley Fire Station - London Fire Brigade, Wembley, Brent, London, 1937
 William Booth Memorial Training College, Denmark Hill, Southwark, 1929
Yardleys Box Factory, Stratford, Greater London, 1937 
  (former Grosvenor Cinema, Ace Cinema), Harrow, London

London - Borough of Hounslow 
Boston Manor tube station, Hounslow, London, 1932
Coty Cosmetics factory, Brentford, 1932
Firestone Tyre Factory, Brentford, Hounslow, London, 1928
 Gillette Corner, Hounslow, London, 1930s
Golden Mile, Brentford, London, 1925
Hartington Court building, Chiswick, London
Hounslow West tube station, Hounslow, London, 1931
JCDecaux (former Currys Head Office), Brentford, Hounslow, 1936
 Osterley tube station, Osterley, Hounslow, London, 1925
 Pyrene Company Building, Brentford, London, 1930
Wallis House (now Barratt building), Brentford, 1936, 1942

London – Borough of Barnet 
 Christ the King, Cockfosters, Barnet, London, 1930
 East Finchley tube station, East Finchley, Barnet, London, 1939
 Everyman Cinema Muswell Hill (formerly the Odeon Cinema), Muswell Hill, Barnet, London, 1936
 Gaumont Finchley, North Finchley, Barnet, London, 1937
 Grand Arcade, North Finchley, Barnet, London, 1930s
 John Keble Church, Mill Hill, Barnet, London, 1936
 Phoenix Cinema, East Finchley, Barnet, London, 1912, 1924

London – Borough of Camden 
 66 Frognal, Camden, London, 1938
 Cambridge Theatre, Camden, London, 1930
 Carreras Cigarette Factory (Arcadia Works), (M.E and O.H Collins with A.G Porri), Camden, London, 1928
 former Burton's, Camden High Street, London
 Cohen House, Chelsea, London, 1936
 Derry & Toms Department store, Kensington and Chelsea, London, 1860, 1933
 Daimler Car Hire Garage (Frames Coach Station), Bloomsbury, Camden, London, 1931
 Freemasons' Hall, London, Camden, London, 1933
 Hillfield Court, Belsize Park, Camden, London, 1934
 Isokon Flats, Hampstead, Camden, London, 1934
 London Forum (formerly the Town & Country Club), Kentish Town, Camden, London, 1934
 London School of Hygiene & Tropical Medicine, Bloomsbury, Camden, London, 1924
 Northwood Hall, Highgate, Camden, London, 1935
 Open Space Theatre, Camden, London, 1968
 Paramount Court, Tottenham Court Road, Camden, London
 Saville Theatre (now Odeon Covent Garden), Camden, London, 1931
 Senate House, Bloomsbury, Camden, London, 1937
 Sun House, Frognal, Hampstead, Camden, London, 1935
 Tavistock Court, Endsleigh Place, Camden, London
 Trinity Court, Gray’s Inn Road, Camden, London, 1935
 Waitrose (former John Barnes department store), Camden, London

London- Borough of Ealing 
 62 The Mall, Ealing, London
 Acton Town tube station, Acton, Ealing, London, 1932
Chiswick Park tube station, Chiswick, Ealing, London, 1932
Ealing Common tube station, Ealing, London, 1931
Hanwell Clock Tower, Hanwell, Ealing, London, 1937
Hoover Building, (Wallis, Gilbert and Partners), Perivale, Ealing, London, 1933–1938
Longfield House, Ealing, London
 Park Royal tube station, Ealing, London, 1931
Tudor Rose nightclub, Southall, Ealing London, 1910, 1929

London – Borough of Greenwich 
 former Burton's Nelson Road (now Bill's Restaurant), Greenwich
 Coronet Cinema, Eltham, Greenwich, 1936
 Eltham Palace extension, (John Seeley & Paul Paget), Eltham, Greenwich, London, 1933
 Meridian House (former Greenwich Town Hall), Greenwich, London, 1939
 New Wine Church (formerly Woolwich Odeon), Woolwich, Greenwich, London, 1937
 former RACS Department Store, Woolwich, Greenwich, London

London – Borough of Kensington and Chelsea 
 Barkers of Kensington, Kensington and Chelsea, London, 1926
 Bluebird Garage, Chelsea, Kensington and Chelsea, London, 1923
 Derry & Toms Department store, Kensington and Chelsea, London, 1860, 1933
 Earls Court Exhibition Centre, Earl's Court, Kensington and Chelsea, London, 1937
 Peter Jones (department store), Chelsea, Kensington and Chelsea, London, 1936
 Kensington High Street, Kensington, Kensington and Chelsea, London
 Nell Gwynn House, Chelsea, Kensington and Chelsea, London, 1937
 Olympia Grand, West Kensington, Kensington and Chelsea, London, 1886
 Sloane Avenue Mansions, Chelsea, Kensington and Chelsea, London, 1933

London – Borough of Lambeth 
 Balham Odeon, Clapham, Lambeth, London, 1938
 Brockwell Lido, Brockwell Park, Herne Hill, Lambeth, London, 1937
 Burton's men's clothing, Streatham, Lambeth, London, 1932
 Clapham South Tube Station, Clapham, Lambeth, London, 1937
 Corner Fielde, Streatham, Lambeth, London, 1937
 The High, Streatham, Lambeth, London, 1937
 Hightrees House, Clapham, Lambeth, London, 1938
 Leigh Hall, Streatham, Lambeth, London, 1936
 Maritime House, Clapham Old Town, Lambeth, London, 1939
 O2 Brixton Academy, Brixton, Lambeth, London, 1929
 Oaklands Estate, Clapham, Lambeth, London, 1936
 Okeavor Manor, Clapham, Lambeth, London, 1935
 Pullman Court, Streatham, Lambeth, London, 1935
 Sharman's (now WHSmith and a Post Office), Streatham, Lambeth, London, 1929
 South London Press Building (now an apartment building), Streatham, Lambeth, London, 1939
 Streathleigh Court, Streatham, Lambeth, London, 1937
 Sunlight Laundry, (F E Simpkins) Acre Lane, Brixton, Lambeth, South London, 1937
 Trinity Close, Clapham, Lambeth, London, 1936
 Windsor Court, Clapham, Lambeth, London, 1936
 Woodlands Building, Clapham, Lambeth, London, 1935

London – Borough of Wandsworth 
 Balham station, Balham, Wandsworth, London, 1926
 Battersea power station, Battersea, Wandsworth, London, 1929, 1945
 Clapham South tube station, Clapham, Wandsworth, 1926
 Du Cane Court, Balham, Wandsworth, 1937
 Gala Bingo Club (formerly the Granada Cinema), Tooting, Wandsworth, London, 1931
 Lakeside Cafe, Battersea Park
 Tooting Bec tube station, Tooting, Wandsworth, London, 1926
 Tooting Broadway tube station, Tooting, Wandsworth, London, 1926
 former Tooting Police Station, Tooting, Wandsworth, London

London – City of London 
 Chamber of Commerce building, City of London, 1934
 Daily Express Building in Fleet Street, City of London, London, 1932
 Daily Telegraph Building (Peterborough House), City of London, 1928
 Florin Court, (Guy Morgan and Partners), City of London, 1936
 Unilever House, Victoria Embankment, Blackfriars, City of London, 1929

London – City of Westminster 
 15 Portman Square, Westminster, London, 1930s
 55 Broadway, Westminster, London, 1929
 59-63 Princes Gate, Westminster, London, 1935
 66 Portland Place, Marylebone, Westminster, London, 1934
 Adelphi Theatre, Westminster, London, 1930
 Alfies Antique Market, Lisson Grove, Westminster, London, 1976
 Apollo Victoria Theatre, Westminster, London, 1930
 BBC Broadcasting House, (Val Myer), Westminster, London, 1932
 Blenstock House (now Bonhams) West End, Westminster, London, 1937
 Claridge's, Mayfair, Westminster, London, 1812, 1920s
 Dolphin Square, Pimlico, Westminster, 1937
 The Dorchester, Mayfair, Westminster, London, 1931
 Grosvenor House Hotel, Mayfair, Westminster, London, 1929
 House of Fraser Oxford Street (former DH Evans), Westminster, London, 1937
 House for Marques and Marquesa de Casa Maury, 58 Hamilton Terrace, Maida Vale, Westminster, London, 1938
 Ideal House (now Palladium House), Westminster, London, 1929
 Lansdowne Club, Mayfair, Westminster, London, 1935
 Lawrence Hall, Westminster, London, 1928
 National Audit Office Head Office (former Imperial Airways Building), Westminster, London
 Odeon Leicester Square, Westminster, London, 1937
Old Aeroworks (former London Spitfire Works), Lisson Grove, Marylebone, Westminster
 The Paviours Arms, Neville House, Page Street, Westminster, London, 1937
 Penguin Pool, London Zoo, Westminster, London, 1934
 Piccadilly Circus tube station, Mayfair, Westminster, London, 1928
 Prince of Wales Theatre, Leicester Square, Westminster, London, 1937
 Royal Institute of British Architects, Marylebone, Westminster, London, 1934
 Savoy Hotel, Westminster, London, 1930, 2010
 Shell Mex House (Ernest Joseph), Westminster, London, 1931
 Sheraton Grand London Park Lane Hotel, Piccadilly, Westminster, London, 1927
 Simpsons of Piccadilly, Piccadilly, Westminster, London, 1936
 Strand Palace Hotel, Westminster, London, 1909, 1930s
 Victoria Coach Station, Westminster, London, 1932
Vue Cinema London- West End (formerly Warner Brothers Theatre), Leicester Square, 1938
 The Washington Mayfair Hotel, Mayfair, Westminster, 1913

Manchester 
 100 King Street, King Street (formerly Midland Bank, Sir Edwin Lutyens, Grade II*), Manchester, 1935
 Appleby Lodge, Rusholme, Manchester, 1930s
 Chadderton Baths, Chadderton, Greater Manchester, 1937
 Daily Express Building, Great Ancoats Street (Sir Owen Williams, Grade II*), Manchester, 1936
 Dancehouse, Manchester, 1930
 Kendals Building, Deansgate (J.S. Beaumont, Grade II), Manchester, 1939
 Longford Cinema ("The Cash Register"), Stratford, Manchester, 1936
 Metro Cinema (formerly Majestic Picture House), Ashton-under-Lynem Tameside, Greater Manchester, 1920
 Midland Bank Building - 100 King Street, Manchester, 1935
 Monaco Ballroom, Hindley, Greater Manchester
 Plaza Cinema (W. Thornley), Stockport, Greater Manchester, 1933
 Primark Building (former Lewis's Building), Manchester, 1920s
 Redfern Building, Dantzic Street (W. A. Johnson and J. W. Cooper, Grade II), Manchester, 1936
 Sunlight House, Quay Street (Joseph Sunlight, Grade II*), Manchester, 1932

Merseyside 
 Beacon House, Southport, Sefton, Merseyside, 1934
 Church of St Monica, Bootle, Merseyside, 1936
 Cremona Corner, Waterloo, Merseyside
 Garrick Theatre (now Mecca Bingo), Southport, Sefton, Merseyside, 1932
 Hoylake railway station, Hoylake, Wirral, Merseyside, 1938
 New Palace Amusement Arcade, New Brighton, Merseyside
 Leo's Bar, Southport, Merseyside
 St. Bernadette's Church, Allerton, Liverpool, Merseyside
 Upton Library, Bromborough, Wirral, Merseyside, 1936

North Yorkshire 
former Burton's Coney Street, York, North Yorkshire, 1931
former Burton's High Ousegate, York, North Yorkshire, 1933
Castle Cinema, Pickering, North Yorkshire, 1937
 Dunlop Factory, Dunlophillow, Pannal, Harrogate, North Yorkshire
Odeon Cinema, Harrogate, North Yorkshire, 1936
 Reel Cinema (formerly Odeon Cinema), York, North Yorkshire

Somerset 
 BlueSkies Apartments, Minehead, Somerset
former Burton's, Weston-super-Mare, Somerset
 Curzon Community Cinema, Clevedon, North Somerset, 1922
 The Forum, Bath, Somerset, 1934
Kudos the Regal Cinema, Wells, Somerset, 1935
 Mecca Bingo Hall and Cinema, Bridgwater, Somerset, 1936
 Odeon Cinema, Weston-super-Mare, Somerset, 1935
 former Odeon Cinema, Yeovil, South Somerset, 1937
 Seaquarium Tropicana, Weston-super-Mare, Somerset

Surrey 
former Burton's, Guildford, Surrey
 Burton's, Walton-on-Thames, Surrey
 former Burton's Woking, Surrey
Dorking Halls, Dorking, Surrey, 1931
Everyman Theatre, Esher, Surrey, 1937
Guildford Cathedral, Guildford, Surrey, 1936–1961
Joldwynds House, Holmbury St. Mary, Surrey, 1932
 Leatherhead Theatre (formerly Thorndike Theatre), Leatherhead, Surrey, 1930s

Tyne and Wear 
 Baltic Centre for Contemporary Art (formerly the Baltic Flour Mill), Gateshead, Tyne and Wear, 1950
 Co-operative Building Newbury Street, Newcastle upon Tyne, Tyne and Wear,
 Jesmond Synagogue, Newcastle upon Tyne, Tyne and Wear, England, 1915
 Newcastle Odeon - Paramount Theatre Building, Newcastle upon Tyne, Tyne and Wear, 1931
 Sunderland Synagogue, Sunderland, Tyne and Wear, 1928
 W.D. & H.O. Wills Building (Wills Factory), Newcastle upon Tyne, 1940s
 West Monkseaton Metro station, Monkseaton, North Tyneside, Tyne and Wear, 1933

Northern Ireland 
 Bank of Ireland (formerly Bangor Grammar School), Bangor
 former Bank of Ireland building, Belfast, 1930
 Broadcasting House, Belfast, Northern Ireland, 1936
 Brookmont Building, Belfast, 1932
 Cafe Nero, Belfast, 1935
 David Keir Building, Queen's University, Belfast, 1957
 Dunnes Stores (formerly Burton's and Woolworth's), Belfast, 1933
 Imperial Building, Donegall Square East, Belfast, 1935
 North Street Arcade, Cathedral Quarter, Belfast, Northern Ireland, 1938
 , Belfast, 1916, 1935
 Strand Cinema (now Strand Arts Centre), Belfast, Northern Ireland, 1935
 Whitlia Hall, Queen's University, Belfast

Scotland 
 Barrfields Pavilion, Barrfields, Largs, North Ayrshire, 1930
 30 Old Kirk Road, Corstorphine, Edinburgh, 1931
 Beach Ballroom, Aberdeen, 1926
 Bellgrove Hotel, Gallowgate, Glasgow, 1930s
 Beresford Hotel (Weddell and Inglis), Glasgow, 1938
 Birks Cinema, Aberfeldy, Perth and Kinross, 1939
 Bon Accord Baths, Aberdeen, 1940
 Castlebrae Business Centre, Peffer Place, Edinburgh, 1936
 Cragburn Pavilion, (J. & J.A. Carrick, 1936), Gourock, Renfrewshire, 1936
 Dominion Cinema, Morningside, Edinburgh, 1938
 India of Inchinnan office block, (former tyre factory, Thomas Wallis) Inchinnan, Renfrewshire, 1930
 Fountainbridge Library, Edinburgh, 1940
 Glasgow Film Theatre, Glasgow, 1939
 India of Inchinnan, Renfewshire, 1930s
 Kino, Leven, Fife, 1937
 Luma Tower, (former lightbulb factory, Cornelius Armour), Greater Govan, Glasgow. 1938
 Maybury Casino, South Maybury, Edinburgh, 1935
 Nardini's Cafe, Largs, Ayrshire, 1935
 New Bedford Cinema, (now the O2 Academy, Lennox and McMath), Gorbals/Laurieston, Glasgow, 1932
 former Odeon Cinema, Glasgow, 1939
 Ravelston Garden, (Andrew Neil and Robert Hurd), Ravelston, Edinburgh, 1936
 Rogano Restaurant, Glasgow, 1935
 Ross House, Hawkhead Hospital, Renfewshire, 1936
 , Rothesay, Argyll and Bute, Isle of Bute, 1938
 Southside Garage, Causewayside, Edinburgh, 1933
 Spirit Aerosystems Building, Prestwick International Airport, Glasgow, 1941
 St Andrew's House, (Thomas S. Tait), Calton Hill, Edinburgh, 1939
 Stonehaven Open Air Pool, Stonehaven, Aberdeenshire, 1934
 Tait Tower, (Thomas S. Tait), Bellahouston Park, Glasgow, 1938
 Tarlair Swimming Pool, MacDuff, Aberdeenshire, 1931
 Weirs Pump, Cathcart, Glasgow
 White House art space, Craigmillar, Edinburgh, 1936
 Willison House (former Robertson's House Furnishers), Dundee, c. 1934 (destroyed by fire, 2022)
 Wilson Memorial United Free Church, Portobello, Edinburgh, 1933
 Younger Hall, St. Andrews, 1929

Wales 
 237 High Street commercial building, Swansea
 Automobile Palace, Llandrindod Wells
 Burton's shop, Abergavenny, Monmouthshire, 1937
 former Burton's shop, Cardiff
 former Burton's shop, Neath
 Burton's shop, Newport
 Canolfan Gwaith Abertawe (Swansea Job Centre), Swansea
 Cardiff Central railway station, Cardiff, 1934
 Coliseum Theatre, Aberdare, 1938
 Cross Hands Public Hall, Cross Hands, Carmarthenshire, 1920
 Guildhall, Swansea 1930–1934
 The NEON (formerly Odeon Cinema), (Harry Weedon) Newport, 1938
 Newport Civic Centre, Newport, 1937
 Noddfa Capel y Bedyddwyr, Porthcawl
 Old Post Office building (now Jaflon Restaurant), Penarth, 1936
 Oystermouth Branch Library, Swansea, 1935
 Penarth Pier, Penarth, Vale of Glamorgan, South Wales, 1934
 Pola Cinema, Welshpool, 1938
 Pritchard and Sons Garage, Llandrindod Wells
 Queen's & Royal Garage, Cardiff, 1930s
 Shangri-La, Pontllanfraith, Blackwood, 1930s
 Tabernacl Welsh Independent Chapel, 1931
 Temple of Peace, Cardiff, 1938
 Villa Marina, Llandudno, 1936
 Wesley Methodist Church, Caerphilly, Caerphilly County Borough
 Winton House, Penarth, Vale of Glamorgan, 1930s

Crown Dependencies 
 Barge Aground cabin, St Ouën, Jersey
 Boots Store, Saint Helier, Jersey
 Burtons Building, Saint Helier, Jersey
 Ferguson's Folly house, Saint Helier, Jersey
 Havre des Pas bathing pool, Saint Helier, Jersey
 Hill Street (Rue des Trais Pigeons), Saint Helier, Jersey
 Les Lumières house, Route Orange, St. Brelade, Jersey
 Play House Apartments (former Playhouse Theatre), Saint Helier, Jersey, 1937
 Saint Matthew's Church, Millbrook, Saint Lawrence, Jersey
 States Building, Saint Helier, Jersey
 Westmount house (Lé Mont ès Pendus), Saint Helier, Jersey

See also 

 List of Art Deco architecture
 Art Deco topics
 Streamline Moderne architecture

References 

 
Art Deco